Ken Johnson (born November 28, 1962 in Memphis, Tennessee, United States) is a former driver in the CART series.

Johnson began his professional racing career in Formula Super Vee, winning the SCCA Pro National Championship in 1985. In 1986 Johnson attempted the first five International Formula 3000 races for BS Automotive. He qualified three times and finished 9th at Vallelunga circuit. That fall he made one American Racing Series start at the Mid-Ohio Sports Car Course. In 1988 he made his CART debut at Laguna Seca for Hemelgarn Racing and finished 12th, scoring one point - good enough for 36th in the championship. In 1989 he again drove in the Laguna Seca CART race, this time for Dale Coyne Racing but his engine expired six laps into the race. He later made 3 starts in the SCCA World Challenge in 1990 and finished 8th in the Toyota Atlantic race at Long Beach in 1992.

Motorsports career results

International Formula 3000 results
(key) (Races in bold indicate pole position; races in italics indicate fastest lap.)

American open–wheel results
(key) (Races in bold indicate pole position)

Formula Super Vee

Toyota Atlantic Championship

CART/Indy Car

References

External links
 

1962 births
Champ Car drivers
International Formula 3000 drivers
Indy Lights drivers
Atlantic Championship drivers
SCCA Formula Super Vee drivers
Formula Super Vee Champions
Living people
Racing drivers from Memphis, Tennessee
Racing drivers from Tennessee
Sportspeople from Memphis, Tennessee

Dale Coyne Racing drivers